Bailey Branch is a stream in Lincoln and Warren counties in the U.S. state of Missouri. It is a tributary of Camp Creek.

The namesake of Bailey Branch is unknown.

See also
List of rivers of Missouri

References

Rivers of Lincoln County, Missouri
Rivers of Warren County, Missouri
Rivers of Missouri